Daniel Wycliffe Sargent (born 22 July 1850, Birmingham, England - died 12 October 1902, Nigeria ) was an early explorer of Africa.

One of eight children, he was born to John and Ann ( Beeney) Sargent. His brother, Edward, was an American architect. 

As Agent General of the British Government, he signed treaties with many African chiefs which allowed the British to establish the Southern Nigeria Protectorate. He was listed as the Agent General of the Royal Niger Company 1889 in Akassa. 

Daniel Sargent had three wives. His second wife, Utsekanua, was the daughter of an African chief. They had one daughter, Ellen Utsekanwa Sargent.

References
Hertslet's Commercial Treaties: A Collection of Treaties and ... - Volume 17 - Page 211
Great Britain, Great Britain. Foreign Office - 1890 - Read - More editions
His D. W. Sargent. >4 Chief Ozom. OYAN. mark. Witnesses to the mark of the Chief of Igabo : Isms Palmer. W. Tl G. Munday. S. F. Jonnson. (8-3.)-—Treaty with the Chiefs of O/caba, January 8, 1885. Her Majesty the Queen

The Encyclopædia Britannica: a dictionary of arts, sciences, ... - Volume 12 - Page 211
Goldie, Sir George Dashwood Taubman (1846- ), English administrator, the founder of Nigeria, was born on the 20th ... Through Joseph Thomson, David Mcintosh, D. W. Sargent, J. Flint, William Wallace, E. Dangerfield and numerous.  
Reference 3. British and foreign state papers, Volume 87 By Great Britain. Foreign Office

Joseph Thomson and the exploration of Africa - Page 210

Robert I. Rotberg - 1971 - Snippet view - More editions
Three days later, with the spectre of Flegel to spur his movements, Thompson joined Hamilton and D. W. Sargent, the Company's second-in-command on the river, aboard the motor launch Frangais. Together they slowly passed through the narrow, 
Joseph Thomson and the exploration of Africa - Page 214

Encyclopedia of exploration, 1850 to 1940: continental exploration - Page 365

1850 births
1902 deaths
People from Birmingham, West Midlands
English explorers
British expatriates in Nigeria